Hateful Run is a stream in Pocahontas County, West Virginia, in the United States.

The stream most likely was named by a local surveyor. Hateful Run has been noted for its unusual place name.

See also
List of rivers of West Virginia

References

Rivers of Pocahontas County, West Virginia
Rivers of West Virginia